Mallett is a surname.

Mallett may also refer to:

Mallett, South Australia, a former town
Mallett Antiques, an antique dealer

See also

Mallett Hall (disambiguation)
Mallett House (disambiguation)